The East German Figure Skating Championships were a figure skating competition held annually to determine the national champions of the German Democratic Republic, often referred to as East Germany. Skaters competed in the disciplines of men's singles, ladies' singles, pair skating, and ice dancing.

Organized by the DELV (the national figure skating association of the GDR), the event was held annually from 1949 to 1990. During the same period, the German Figure Skating Championships were held in the Federal Republic of Germany, commonly known as West Germany. Following the reunification of Germany, East German skaters competed at the German Championships, and the East German championships were discontinued.

Medalists

Men

Ladies

Pairs

Ice dancing

References

Sources
 newspaper Sportecho (former East Germany) and other East German newspapers

 

 
Figure skating national championships
Figure skating in East Germany
Figure skating